Rectitropis is a genus of spur-throated grasshoppers in the family Acrididae. There are at least three described species in Rectitropis, found in Australia.

Species
These three species belong to the genus Rectitropis:
 Rectitropis australis Sjöstedt, 1936 (Queensland White-tips)
 Rectitropis brunneri (Bolívar, 1898)
 Rectitropis exclusa (Walker, 1870) (Territory White-tips)

References

External links

 

Acrididae